Hallelujah for the Cross marks the seventeenth album from the Newsboys. Capitol Christian Music Group released the project on 4 November 2014. The Newsboys worked with producer Seth Mosley in the creation of this album.

Reception

Signaling in a -star review by AllMusic, Matt Collar recognizes, "Featuring nine classic hymns, as well as one brand-new song, Hallelujah for the Cross is anything but a traditional hymns album." Alex Caldwell, agrees it is a -star album for Jesus Freak Hideout, responds, "the Newsboys capably and reverently update these classic songs and words for a new generation of worshipers." Adding a half star to her rating compared to the aforementioned, New Release Tuesday's Sarah Fine realizes, "Not only does the band pull off these timeless tracks remarkably well, they manage to infuse their solid signature sound into each and every crevasse." Tony Cummings, indicating in an eight out of ten review for Cross Rhythms, reports, "the Newsboys have done the youthful Church a considerable service in bringing a set of timeless songs to their attention." Awarding the album four stars for 365 Days of Inspiring Media, Nelson Russia writes, "In Hallelujah For The Cross, Newsboys delivers a passionate blend of fresh and uplifting sounds and instrumentations that is distinctive to Newsboys, while keeping true to the truth, wisdom and meaning behind these songs and respecting the melody of these timeless collection of hymns." Julia Kitzing, awarding the album  stars from CM Addict, says, "this album is very well done, and done in such a way that the Newsboys honor the people who wrote the songs long ago, but they also add a Newsboys sound to them." Rating the album a 3.5 out of five for Christian Music Review, April Covington writes, "Hallelujah For the Cross is a great addition to your playlist."

Track listing

Personnel 

Newsboys
 Michael Tait – lead and backing vocals 
 Jody Davis – guitars, backing vocals 
 Jeff Frankenstein – keyboards, programming  
 Duncan Phillips – drums, percussion

Additional musicians
 Ben Backus – keyboards, programming, guitars, bass, backing vocals 
 Seth Mosley – keyboards, programming, guitars, bass, backing vocals, arrangements 
 Tim Lauer – keyboards, programming
 Matt Stanfield – keyboards, programming
 Mike Payne – guitars
 Eli Beaird – bass 
 Tony Lucido – bass
 Nick Buda – drums 
 Ben Phillips – drums
 Nir Z – drums 
 Wes Campbell – arrangements
 Dianne Sheets – backing vocals (9)

Production
 Seth Mosley – producer, engineer, engineer, editing
 David Garcia – vocal producer 
 Wes Campbell – executive producer 
 Dave Wagner – assistant executive producer
 Dave Hagen – engineer, editing
 Buckley Miller – engineer, editing
 Mike "X" O'Connor – engineer, editing
 Jericho Scroggins – engineer, editing
 Sean Moffitt – mixing 
 Dave McNair – mastering

Charts

References

2014 albums
Newsboys albums